In the Whyte notation for describing steam locomotive wheel arrangement, a 2-6-6 is a locomotive with a two-wheeled  leading truck, six driving wheels, and a six-wheeled trailing truck.  All the locomotives produced of this arrangement have been tank locomotives, and the vast majority in the United States.  It was a popular arrangement for the larger Mason Bogies, as well as some of the largest suburban tank locomotives.

Equivalent classifications
Other equivalent classifications are:
UIC classification: 1C3 (also known as German classification and Italian classification)
French classification: 133
Turkish classification: 37
Swiss classification: 3/7

References 

6,2-6-6T
6,2-6-6T